The Kingdom Tour was a co-headlining concert tour by reggaeton superstars Daddy Yankee and Don Omar.

Initial plans of this tour was The Kingdom "a 60-date Yankee/Omar tour that is scheduled to run for two years. Also, this partnership included a joint album and a TV show for the two artists. However, for unknown reasons only nine concerts were performed.

Commercial performance 
The first two shows in the Coliseo de Puerto Rico were sold out in record time. Due to high demand two more shows were added.

Tour dates

Box office data

References 

2015 concert tours
2016 concert tours
Concert tours of the United States
Daddy Yankee concert tours
Don Omar concert tours